Jyotirindra Nath Nandi Metro Station is an under construction metro station of Line 6 of the Kolkata Metro. The station would serve Mukundapur, Santoshpur and Ajoy Nagar areas outlying the E.M. Bypass section of the city.

The station is named in honour of the Bengali writer, Jyotirindranath Nandi.

See also
List of Kolkata Metro stations

References 

Kolkata Metro stations
Railway stations in Kolkata